Gauravdeep Singh Pansotra (born 9 November 1997) is a Hong Kong professional footballer of Indian descent who plays as a midfielder and is currently a free agent.

Career statistics

Club

Notes

References

Living people
1997 births
Hong Kong footballers
Hong Kong people of Indian descent
Association football midfielders
Hong Kong First Division League players
Hong Kong Premier League players
Hong Kong Rangers FC players
Resources Capital FC players